The first season of Alone premiered on June 18, 2015 on History and concluded on August 27, with 10 episodes and 1 special recap/behind-the-scenes episode. Each season follows the self-documented daily struggles of 10 individuals as they survive alone in the wilderness for as long as possible using a limited amount of survival equipment. With the exception of medical check-ins, the participants are isolated from each other and all other humans. They may "tap out" at any time, or be removed due to failing a medical check-in. The contestant who remains the longest wins a grand prize of $500,000.

The first season was won by Alan Kay, who lost over 60 pounds during the course of the season. His staple foods were limpets and seaweed. He also consumed mussels, crab, fish and slugs.

Episodes

Contestants 
Lucas Miller enjoyed his time on the show and was selected based on his work as a wilderness therapist. His most difficult experience with the show was making honest confessions to the camera. Sam Larson described his time on the show as "playing in the woods". He set a goal for himself to last 50 days. After he reached his goal, a large storm hit the island, which Larson described as being larger than any he had seen and prompting his decision to leave the island. Larson said that the loneliness and solitude took the most time to adjust to, and that his preparation for the show mostly consisted of mental preparation.

Production

Location and filming 

The season was shot in Quatsino Territory, located near Port Hardy, British Columbia.

Quatsino is a small hamlet of 91 people located on Quatsino Sound in Northern Vancouver Island, Canada, only accessible by boat or float plane. Its nearest neighbour is Coal Harbour, to the east, about 20 minutes away by boat, and Port Alice, to the south, about 40 minutes away by boat. The largest town in the region, Port Hardy, is located about an hour northeast by boat and vehicle.

References 

2010s American reality television series
2015 American television seasons
2015 in British Columbia
Television shows set in British Columbia
Television shows filmed in British Columbia